Hawksworth may refer to:

Places
Hawksworth, Nottinghamshire, village in Nottinghamshire, England
Hawksworth, Leeds, a suburb in the Kirkstall area of Leeds, West Yorkshire, England
Hawksworth, Guiseley, a village in the City of Leeds Metropolitan District, West Yorkshire, England

Other uses
Hawksworth (surname)
Hawksworth Restaurant, fine-dining restaurant in Vancouver, British Columbia, Canada

See also
Hawkesworth, a surname